Black Sunday is a 1977 American action thriller film directed by John Frankenheimer and based on Thomas Harris' novel of the same name. It was produced by Robert Evans, and stars Robert Shaw, Bruce Dern and Marthe Keller. It was nominated for the Edgar Allan Poe Award in 1978. The screenplay was written by Ernest Lehman, Kenneth Ross and Ivan Moffat. Ross had previously written the screenplay for The Day of the Jackal, a similar plot-driven political thriller. The inspiration of the story came from the Munich massacre, perpetrated by the Black September organization against Israeli athletes at the 1972 Summer Olympics, giving the title for the novel and film.

Plot
Michael Lander is a pilot who flies the Goodyear Blimp over National Football League games to film them for network television. Secretly deranged by years of torture as a POW in the Vietnam War, he had a bitter court martial on his return and a failed marriage. He longs to kill himself and to take with him as many as possible of the cheerful, carefree civilians he sees from his blimp each weekend.

Lander is desperately in love with Dahlia Iyad, an operative from the Palestinian terrorist group Black September, who controls and manipulates him. They conspire together to launch a suicide attack using a bomb composed of plastique and a quarter-million steel flechettes.  They plan to mount the bomb on the underside of the gondola of the Goodyear blimp which traditionally flies over the Super Bowl football game, and detonate it over the Miami Orange Bowl during Super Bowl X, in order to call attention to the plight of the Palestinians and to punish the United States for supporting Israel.

During a raid on a Black September unit in the Middle East, the Israeli counter-terrorist Mossad agent David Kabakov surprises Iyad while she is bathing. His mission was to kill everyone in the unit; however, seeing her unarmed and naked, he spares her life and turns his attention to clearing the rest of the unit.  She escapes. When the raid is complete, Kabakov finds a recorded message which Iyad had planned to publish after the terrorist attack. The recording explains the motive for the terrorism, but does not include any specific information about the attack plan itself. Collaborating with FBI agent Sam Corley, Kabakov and his partner Robert Moshevsky try to learn the details of the plan. Meanwhile, Black September bribes freighter captain Tekiaki Ogawa to transport the plastic explosives, disguised as statuettes. Ogawa puts the explosives aboard Iyad and Lander's motorboat, but the two terrorists are discovered by the Coast Guard and forced to flee.

Ogawa is interrogated by Kabakov and Moshevsky, only for a bomb Lander had secretly planted to explode, killing Ogawa and injuring Kabakov, who is hospitalized. Iyad disguises herself as a nun to infiltrate the hospital and assassinate Kabakov, only for Moshevsky to discover her. When he tries to report her to the hospital security, she kills him and escapes. Kabakov uses a contact in the Egyptian government named Riaf to discover her identity, and Corley tracks Iyad and her superior Mohammed Fasil to a hotel in Miami. They attempt to capture them, but Iyad escapes, while Fasil is killed. After searching Iyad's room, Kabakov realizes that they are targeting the Super Bowl. Corley and Kabakov form a security detail to search the crowd for any sign of suspicious activity. During the Super Bowl game, Kabakov figures out that Iyad and Lander have mounted the bomb on the Goodyear blimp.  He and Corley commandeer a helicopter and set out in pursuit of the blimp, accompanied by a police helicopter.

Loaded with the bomb, the blimp approaches the stadium.  Lander pilots the blimp while Iyad exchanges deadly gunfire with policemen in the pursuing helicopters. From his place in one helicopter, Kabakov sees Iyad's face, and recognizes her as the Black September agent whose life he had previously spared. This time he does not hesitate; he shoots and kills her.  Lander is mortally wounded, but he lasts long enough to succeed in flying the blimp straight into the Super Bowl, causing mass  chaos and destruction in the stadium. Just before dying, Lander lights the fuse of the weapon. Just minutes away from detonation, Kabakov lowers himself from the helicopter to the blimp, and hooks it up with a cable to the helicopter, which hauls it out of the panicked stadium and over the ocean. Kabakov unhooks the cable from the blimp, and clings to the cable as the helicopter moves away to a safe distance. A few seconds later, the bomb detonates, firing the flechettes harmlessly into the water.

Cast
As appearing in Black Sunday (main roles and screen credits identified):

Production

The film was produced by former Paramount Pictures chief Robert Evans. He had earlier produced Chinatown (1974) and Marathon Man (1976). Director John Frankenheimer's frequent line producer Robert L. Rosen was credited as executive producer.

As it hinged on filming a real Goodyear Blimp at a real Super Bowl, many challenges existed. Luckily, Frankenheimer had a good relationship with Goodyear Tire and Rubber Company head Robert Lane, as a result of working with Goodyear on his earlier film Grand Prix.  Lane told Frankenheimer, "You're the only person I've ever worked with who has kept his word." Frankenheimer told Goodyear that if they declined the use of their blimps, he would rent the only other large blimp in the world from Germany, paint it silver, and people would assume it was theirs anyway. Lane granted Frankenheimer use of Goodyear's blimps on three conditions: the film had to make clear that the villainous pilot did not work directly for Goodyear, but for a contractor; the final explosion could not come out of the word Goodyear on the blimp's side; and the blimp itself could not be part of any violence, for example nobody was to be churned up in its propellers.

Evans helped secure the unprecedented cooperation of the National Football League and the production was allowed to film at Super Bowl X on January 18, 1976 and shoot extensive footage with the principal actors for the film's final half hour as the Pittsburgh Steelers beat the Dallas Cowboys 21–17. The production returned to the Miami Orange Bowl on January 29, 1976, to film the final moments of the pursuit, as the blimp crashes into the stadium. A mockup nose section of the blimp was recreated. The thousands of extras needed for this footage, which obviously could not be shot during the real Super Bowl, were instead provided by the United Way charity, in exchange for Frankenheimer directing a promotional film for them, narrated by Shaw. Members of the Miami Dolphins were hired and outfitted with Cowboys and Steelers uniforms to appear in the footage as well. During filming of the chaotic scenes of panic as the blimp descends into the crowds, Dolphins player Barry Hill fell and injured himself, requiring a splint and a bandage on his right hand.

Blimps
Goodyear granted the film use of all three of its U.S.-based blimps for Black Sunday. The blimps were flown by company pilots Nick Nicolary and Corky Belanger Sr., among the five pilots who were involved in the production. The landing and hijacking scenes were photographed at the Goodyear blimp base in Carson, California with the Columbia (N4A). A short scene was filmed at the Spring, Texas base with the America (N10A). The extensive Miami Super Bowl scenes were filmed with the noticeably smaller blimp Mayflower (N1A), which was then based on Watson Island across the Port of Miami. While Goodyear allowed the use of their airship fleet in the film, they did not allow the "Goodyear Wingfoot" logo (prominently featured on the sides of the blimp) to be used in any advertising or the poster for the film.  Thus, the words "Super Bowl" are featured in place of the logo on the blimp in all advertising collateral.

Music
The film's score was composed by John Williams. In January 2010, Film Score Monthly issued a limited edition of 10,000 copies of the previously unreleased soundtrack, remixed from the original masters.

Reception
The film grossed $15.8 million against a budget of $8 million. Director Frankenheimer felt the film was hurt by the fact an earlier movie about terrorism at a championship football game, Two-Minute Warning, had come out just beforehand and performed poorly. He also blamed the film's audience response on the fact the film was banned in Germany and Japan.

The review aggregator website Rotten Tomatoes reports that 71% of critics have given the film a positive review based on 28 reviews, with an average rating of 7.4/10. The site's critics consensus reads, "A smart, tense thriller from director John Frankenheimer, Black Sunday succeeds on a technical level, even if it fails to bring its characters to vivid life." On Metacritic, the film has a weighted average score of 57 out of 100 based on 8 critics, indicating "mixed or average reviews". In general, Black Sunday was appreciated more for its technical virtues and storyline than its character development. Reviewer Vincent Canby from The New York Times tried to rationalize his reaction: "I suspect it has to do with the constant awareness that the story is more important than anybody in it ... The characters don't motivate the drama in any real way." In a later review, Christopher Null took exception and identified the one key character who drove the plot: "... Black Sunday is distinguished by its unique focus not on the hero but on the villain: Bruce Dern ..." John Simon said that Black Sunday "is one of those films that are perfectly enjoyable to watch but [about] which there is not all that much to say". Simon did praise the acting of Robert Shaw, Bruce Dern, Fritz Weaver, Michael V. Gazzo, William Daniels, Steven Keats and Walter Gotell, but said Marthe Keller lacked power and had no charisma.

Homage
Quentin Tarantino has said in interviews that the sequence in Kill Bill: Volume 1 where Daryl Hannah attempts to kill The Bride in disguise as a nurse is an homage to a similar sequence in Black Sunday. More specifically, he said the fact that the sequence in his film is done with split-screens is actually an homage to the trailer for Black Sunday, which shows shots from the sequence in that manner, unlike in the actual film.

Satire
The film was parodied as "Blimp Sunday" in the December 1977 issue of Mad Magazine #195, in a story written by Dick DeBartolo with art from Mort Drucker.

References

Notes

Bibliography

 Champlin, Charles, ed. John Frankenheimer: A Conversation With Charles Champlin. Bristol, UK: Riverwood Press, 1995. .
 Dern, Bruce and Robert Crane. Things I've Said, But Probably Shouldn't Have ... Indianapolis, Indiana: Wiley, 2007. .
 Pomerance, Murray and R. Barton Palmer, eds. A Little Solitaire: John Frankenheimer and American Film. Piscataway, New Jersey: Rutgers University Press, 2011. .

External links
 
 
 
 
   Shot by an extra during a day of filming at The Miami Orange Bowl

1970s action thriller films
1977 films
American action thriller films
American football films
American aviation films
Dallas Cowboys
1970s English-language films
Films scored by John Williams
Films directed by John Frankenheimer
Films based on American novels
Films based on thriller novels
Films set in Lebanon
Films set in Los Angeles
Films set in Miami
Films set in Washington, D.C.
Goodyear Tire and Rubber Company
Pittsburgh Steelers in popular culture
Super Bowl in fiction
Films produced by Robert Evans
Films about terrorism in the United States
Films with screenplays by Ernest Lehman
Films about the Federal Bureau of Investigation
Films about the Mossad
1970s American films